Egil or Egill is a masculine given name derived from Old Norse. It may refer to:

Characters
Egil (Hymiskvida), farmer in the poem Hymiskvida
Egil, brother of Volund, hero of Völundarkviða and the Thidreks saga
Egil One-Hand, hero from the Icelandic saga Egils saga einhenda ok Ásmundar berserkjabana
Ongentheow, also known as Egil

Places
Eğil, a district of Diyarbakır Province, south eastern Turkey
Egil Peak, Sverdrup Mountains, Antarctica

Other uses
Egil (given name)
Electrical Generation and Integrated Lighting Systems Engineer, NASA flight controller

See also
Alt for Egil, a 2004 Norwegian musical film directed by Tore Rygh, starring Kristoffer Joner and Trond Høvik
Egil's Saga, 13th century Icelandic saga
Egill Skallagrímsson Brewery, an Icelandic brewery and beverage company based in Reykjavík and founded on April 17, 1913